The men's 800 metres event at the 1967 Pan American Games was held in Winnipeg on 1 and 2 August.

Medalists

Results

Heats

Final

References

Athletics at the 1967 Pan American Games
1967